Kyay oh is a popular noodle soup made with pork and egg in Burmese cuisine. Fish and chicken versions are also made as well as a "dry" version without broth. Kyay oh is traditionally served in a copper pot. Kyay oh is made with rice noodles (rice vermicelli or flat rice noodles) and marinated meatballs. The broth is made with pork, chicken, or fish. The pork version, the most popular, uses pork bones and intestine. Kyay oh is typically served with a tomato and green pepper sauce.

Dry kyay oh salad, called kyay oh sigyet (ကြေးအိုးဆီချက်), is made without broth and uses sesame oil. It is topped with fried garlic sprinkles. The salad, like the soup, includes meatball, egg, pork brain, green choy and triangular-shaped crispy waffles stuff with meat. Other ingredients include salt, garlic powder, ginger and pepper.

The first kyay oh restaurant, Kyay Oh Bayin, was founded in 1968 in Rangoon (now Yangon). YKKO, founded in 1988, with 38 restaurants, is the most numerous of the kyay oh chains.

References

Burmese cuisine
Noodle soups